Maromme is a commune in the Seine-Maritime department in the Normandy region in northern France.

Geography
SNCF operates a TER rail service here.

Heraldry

Population

Places of interest
 The church of St.Martin, dating from the nineteenth century.

People with links to the commune
 Aimable Pélissier (1794–1864), Marshal of France, was born here
 Georges Chedanne (1861–1940), architect, was born here
 Georges Bradberry (1878–1959), artist, was born here

Twin towns
 Norderstedt, Germany
 Signa, Italy
 Binche, Belgium
 Oadby and Wigston, England

See also
Communes of the Seine-Maritime department

References

External links

Website about the commune 

Communes of Seine-Maritime